Al Farouk de Tombouctou is a football and basketball club based in the Malian city of Timbuktu.

Football
Al Farouk were promoted for the first time to the Malian Premiere Division in September 2008, after winning the Division 2, group A tournament, based in their home city of Timbuktu. They had never previously played in the nation's top division, although they competed in the promotion championship in the 2003–2006 seasons.

Achievements
 Malien second division: Group A champions (2008)

Basketball
Al Farouk has also fielded successful men's and women's basketball teams, with their men's team being invited to the Top Eight Malian championship in 2008.

References

 https://web.archive.org/web/20141221083223/http://www.footmali.com/ (Le football au Mali)
Playoff results: 2003/2004/2005/2006 From Rec sport soccer.
Cup result: 2008 From Rec sport soccer.

Football clubs in Mali
Timbuktu